Rioja is the capital of Rioja Province in the San Martín Region in northern Peru. It is situated to the west of Moyobamba. There are 24,263 inhabitants according to the 2007 census.

The town is 848 metres above sea level and has a semi-humid subtropical climate.

History
During the period of the Incas, the Rioja Province was inhabited by two tribes, the Uquihuas and the Chepenes.

At the end of the 16th century, one of the first Catholic missionaries arrived at Uquihua.

Rioja was founded in September, 1782 and was originally named Santo Toribio de la Nueva Rioja.

Geography
Rioja is situated in the valley of the upper Mayo River in the north of the San Martín Region. Its coordinates are longitude  77°08’30”  and latitude 06º03’00”.

The peaks surrounding Rioja exceed 1,000 metres above sea level.

The average temperature is 22.5 °C. with actual temperatures varying between 16.5 °C and 28.4 °C.

Communications and Transport

Rioja is connected to the rest of the country by land, air, and water.

Land
Connections via the "Carretera Marginal" (the main jungle highway). There are daily bus services as well as minibuses, collective taxis and lorries.

Air
The Rioja Airport accommodates small and medium sized airplanes, both for passengers and cargo.

River
Motor boats, canoes and rafts use the Mayo, Tonchima and Negro rivers for small cargo.

References

Populated places in the San Martín Region